P. maxima may refer to:

 Paracrocidura maxima, an African mammal
 Pectinodonta maxima, a true limpet
 Phyllosticta maxima, a plant pathogen
 Pinctada maxima, a pearl oyster
 Pisulina maxima, a cave snail
 Pitta maxima, a bird endemic to North Maluku
 Pollex maxima, an Indonesian moth
 Premna maxima, a plant endemic to Kenya
 Problepsis maxima, a Japanese moth
 Psetta maxima, a demersal fish
 Pseudoeurycea maxima, a salamander endemic to Mexico
 Purlovia maxima, a therocephalian therapsid